Enrique Alonso (born 14 April 1965) is a Spanish former racing cyclist. He rode in the 1992 Tour de France.

References

External links
 

1965 births
Living people
Spanish male cyclists
People from Mondragón
Sportspeople from Gipuzkoa
Cyclists from the Basque Country (autonomous community)